David Willson may refer to:

 David Willson (Quaker) (1778–1866), religious leader and mystic
 David Harris Willson (1901–1973), American historian and professor

See also
 David Wilson (disambiguation)